The 2017 NCAA Division I FBS football season was the highest level of college football competition in the United States organized by the National Collegiate Athletic Association (NCAA) in 2017. The regular season began on August 26, 2017, and ended on December 9, 2017. The postseason concluded on January 8, 2018 with the 2018 College Football Playoff National Championship in Atlanta. This was the fourth season of the College Football Playoff championship system.

Rule changes

Game rules 
The following rule changes were recommended by the NCAA Football Rules Committee for the 2017 season:

 Prohibiting defensive players running toward the line of scrimmage from leaping or hurdling any offensive lineman on field goal or PAT attempts (15 yards).  Previously defensive players were allowed to leap or hurdle offensive linemen as long as they do not land on another player.  The NFL also adopted this rule for the 2017 season.
 Requiring players to wear knee pads and pants that cover the knees.  Previously this was only a recommendation.
 Include the nameplate on the back of the jersey in the definition of a "horse-collar tackle".

The committee left the current targeting rules unchanged for the 2017 season, despite discussions to modify the rule to eject a player for targeting only if the call is confirmed, not if the call stands due to lack of "indisputable video evidence" to overturn the ruling on the field.

Points of emphasis this season include speeding up games by:
Promptly starting the second half when the halftime clock reaches 0:00.
Penalizing coaches for coming on the field to argue a call (15 yards, unsportsmanlike conduct).
Starting the game clock immediately upon spotting the ball after a ball carrier goes out of bounds (outside of the last 2:00 of each half).

Recruiting rules 

The NCAA Division I Council approved a suite of rule changes affecting the recruiting process. The most significant of these are:
 Effective with the 2017–18 school year, a national early signing period for high school players will be introduced, at a time in December to be announced later.
 The current limit of 25 new scholarships (or financial aid agreements) per academic year will become an absolute limit (with only narrowly defined exceptions). This has been seen by media as ending the phenomenon of oversigning.
 FBS programs may no longer conduct so-called "satellite camps"—i.e., camps or clinics that feature active FBS coaches or football staff members held at locations distant from the school's campus. Effective immediately, FBS coaches may only work at camps for a total of 10 days in June and July, and can only attend camps if they are located on their school's campus, or at an off-campus facility where their program regularly practices or plays home games. Schools are allowed to honor contracts for satellite camps that were signed before January 18, 2017.
 The Collegiate Commissioners Association, which controls the letter of intent program, approved the recruiting changes approved last month by the Division I Council. The early signing period for high schoolers is fixed as the first three days of the midyear signing period for junior college players; in 2017, this window will fall on December 20–22.

Conference realignment

Membership changes

Coastal Carolina is in the second year of its FBS transition. It is counted as an FBS opponent for scheduling purposes but will not become a full bowl-eligible member until the 2018 season.

The UAB football team returned after a two-year absence. The program was shut down by school administrators following the 2014 season but was reinstated less than a year later. UAB resumed its place as a full, football-sponsoring member of Conference USA.

Upcoming changes 
Idaho and New Mexico State are playing their final seasons as football members of the Sun Belt Conference. Idaho is also playing its last season at the FBS level; following the decision of the Sun Belt to not extend its football membership agreements with the two schools after their expirations in 2017, Idaho announced that it would downgrade to FCS and add football to its standing membership in the Big Sky Conference. New Mexico State will tentatively revert to FBS Independent status for 2018 and beyond.

Updated stadiums

Two schools opened new stadiums for the 2017 season:
 Colorado State opened Sonny Lubick Field at Colorado State Stadium. The on-campus facility, with a capacity of 41,201, replaces the off-campus Hughes Stadium, which had been home to the Rams since 1968.
 Georgia State moved from the Georgia Dome, set to be demolished during the 2017 season, to Georgia State Stadium. This is the third incarnation of a stadium that opened in 1996 as the Centennial Olympic Stadium, built for the 1996 Summer Olympics. The stadium was planned from the beginning to be retrofitted into a baseball park for the Atlanta Braves, and opened in that form as Turner Field in 1997. After the Braves vacated Turner Field following their 2016 season to move into SunTrust Park, Georgia State bought Turner Field and adjacent property for a major campus expansion project. In its football form, the stadium initially seats 23,000 with possible future expansion to 33,000.

Several other schools plan to debut major improvements to their existing venues for 2017:
Arizona State is continuing a four-phase renovation of Sun Devil Stadium. The third phase, slated for completion in time for the 2017 season, includes the addition of a new video board above the north end zone.
Coastal Carolina will make its FBS debut in an expanded Brooks Stadium. The expansion project began immediately after the 2015 season, a few months after Coastal announced it would join the Sun Belt Conference in 2016 for non-football sports and 2017 for football. The venue, which previously held 9,200 people, will now have a capacity of 15,000 for the 2017 season, and will be further expanded to 20,000 in 2018.   
West Virginia is nearing completion of approximately $50 million in renovations to Milan Puskar Stadium. Work on the west and south side gates and concourses, including renovations to concessions, restrooms, and additional space for EMS and police operations, is expected to be complete for 2017, mirroring similar work on the north and east sides completed for 2016.
Louisiana Tech will open a new pressbox and suite complex on the west side of Joe Aillet Stadium which includes new ticketing facilities and restrooms. Also included in the renovations are, new LED stadium lighting fixtures.
Notre Dame will debut the Campus Crossroads project, which will add three new 8-story structures on the South, West and East sides of Notre Dame Stadium. The expansion will add new premium stadium seats on the East and West sides of the stadium and feature more than 750,000 square feet of teaching, research, and performance space.

Two schools announced naming rights deals for their stadiums:
Kentucky renamed its stadium from Commonwealth Stadium to Kroger Field per a 12-year naming rights deal with the Cincinnati-based supermarket company. This makes UK the first Southeastern Conference school to enter into such a deal for its football stadium.
 New Mexico renames its stadium from University Stadium to Dreamstyle Stadium per a 10-year naming rights deal with Albuquerque-based construction firm Dreamstyle Remodeling.

Kickoff games

"Week Zero"
A recent rule change allows Hawai'i, and teams that have a scheduled game at Hawai'i, to play during the "Week Zero" kickoff weekend in late August.  This change better accommodates the long-standing "Hawai'i rule" that allows schools which travel between Hawai'i and the mainland (including schools based in Hawai'i) to schedule an extra game each season.  Four schools have taken advantage of the extra week:
Hawai'i played at UMass on August 26, with the visitors winning 38–35. UMass ended their 2016 season with a loss at Hawai'i, and thus opened their 2017 season against the same opponent.
BYU hosted FCS opponent Portland State on August 26, winning 20–6.
San Jose State hosted USF on August 26, with the visitors winning 42–22. 
Colorado State hosted Oregon State on August 26 in the first game at the Rams' new stadium (see above), and won 58–27.
Stanford and Rice played in Sydney on August 26 (August 27 local time) for the second Sydney Cup, won by Stanford in a 62–7 blowout. This was the second straight year a Pac-12 team went to Australia, as California defeated Hawai'i in the first Sydney Cup to open the 2016 season.

Week 1
During the official Week 1 (as usual, held the weekend before Labor Day), several neutral-site "kickoff weekend" games were held, in addition to a full slate of games held at home stadiums around the U.S.:  
Advocare Classic
#17 Florida played against #11 Michigan at AT&T Stadium (Arlington, Texas) on September 2, with Michigan winning 33–17.
Belk Kickoff Game
 North Carolina State played against South Carolina at Bank of America Stadium (Charlotte, North Carolina) on September 2, with the Gamecocks winning 35–28.
Chick-fil-A Kickoff Games
#1 Alabama defeated #3 Florida State Alabama rolled past FSU 24–7 at the new Mercedes-Benz Stadium (Atlanta, Georgia) on September 2.
#25 Tennessee defeated Georgia Tech Tennessee came back and won in a classic 42–41 in double overtime at Mercedes-Benz Stadium on September 4.
Advocare Texas Kickoff
 #13 LSU defeated BYU LSU stumped BYU 27–0 at the Mercedes-Benz Superdome (New Orleans, Louisiana) on September 2.

Regular season top 10 matchups
Rankings reflect the AP Poll. Rankings for Week 10 and beyond will list College Football Playoff Rankings first and AP Poll second. Teams that fail to be a top 10 team for one poll or the other will be noted.
Week 1
No. 1 Alabama defeated No. 3 Florida State, 24–7 (Mercedes-Benz Stadium, Atlanta, GA)
Week 2
No. 5 Oklahoma defeated No. 2 Ohio State, 30–16 (Ohio Stadium, Columbus, OH)
Week 9
No. 6 Ohio State defeated No. 2 Penn State, 39–38 (Ohio Stadium, Columbus, OH)
Week 11
No. 10/10 Auburn defeated No. 1/2 Georgia, 40–17 (Jordan–Hare Stadium, Auburn, AL)
No. 7/7 Miami defeated No. 3/3 Notre Dame, 41–8 (Hard Rock Stadium, Miami Gardens, FL)
No. 5/5 Oklahoma defeated No. 6/8 TCU, 38–20 (Gaylord Family Oklahoma Memorial Stadium, Norman, OK)
Week 13
 No. 6/6 Auburn defeated No. 1/1 Alabama, 26–14 (Jordan–Hare Stadium, Auburn, AL)
Week 14
 No. 1/1 Clemson defeated No. 7/7 Miami, 38–3 (2017 ACC Championship Game), Bank of America Stadium, Charlotte, NC
 No. 6/6 Georgia defeated No. 2/4 Auburn, 28–7 (2017 SEC Championship Game, Mercedes-Benz Stadium, Atlanta, GA)
 No. 3/2 Oklahoma defeated No. 11/10 TCU, 41–17 (2017 Big 12 Championship Game, AT&T Stadium, Arlington, TX)
 No. 8/8 Ohio State defeated No. 4/3 Wisconsin, 27–21 (2017 Big Ten Championship Game, Lucas Oil Stadium, Indianapolis, IN)

Upsets
For purposes of this table, an "upset" involves an unranked team defeating a ranked team.

FBS rankings prior to November 1 are from the AP Poll, and from the College Football Playoff rankings after that date.

Conference standings

Conference summaries
Through the 2015 season, conferences were required to have a minimum of 12 members to play a conference championship game that was exempt from the NCAA limit of 12 regular-season games. The NCAA removed this requirement effective with the 2016 season. At that time, all FBS conferences except the Big 12 and Sun Belt Conferences held season-ending championship games. With the Big 12 reinstating its championship game for the 2017 season, only the Sun Belt Conference determines its champion solely by regular-season records, and that conference will launch a championship game in 2018.

Bowl eligibility

For the 39 post-season bowl games, teams should be bowl eligible to be selected.  Normally, this requires a team to have a minimum of a 0.500 winning percentage.  If there are not be enough winning teams to fulfill all open bowl slots, teams with losing records could be chosen in order to fill all 78 slots.  Additionally, in the rare occasions where a conference champion does not meet eligibility requirements, they are usually still chosen for bowl games with tie-ins for that conference champion.

Bowl eligible teams
American Athletic Conference (7): Houston, Memphis, Navy, South Florida, SMU, Temple, UCF
Atlantic Coast Conference (9): Boston College, Clemson, Duke, Louisville, Miami, North Carolina State, Virginia, Virginia Tech, Wake Forest
Big 12 Conference (8): Iowa State, Kansas State, Oklahoma, Oklahoma State, Texas, Texas Tech, TCU, West Virginia 
Big Ten Conference (8): Iowa, Michigan, Michigan State, Northwestern, Ohio State, Penn State, Purdue, Wisconsin
Conference USA (10): Florida Atlantic, FIU, Louisiana Tech, Marshall, Middle Tennessee, North Texas, Southern Miss, UAB, Western Kentucky, UTSA
Independents (2): Army, Notre Dame
Mid-American Conference (7): Akron, Buffalo, Central Michigan, Northern Illinois, Ohio, Toledo, Western Michigan 
Mountain West Conference (6): Boise State, Colorado State, Fresno State, San Diego State, Utah State, Wyoming 
Pac-12 Conference (9): Arizona, Arizona State, Oregon, Stanford, UCLA, USC, Utah, Washington, Washington State
Southeastern Conference (9): Alabama, Auburn, Georgia, Kentucky, LSU, Mississippi State, Missouri, South Carolina, Texas A&M
Sun Belt Conference (4): Appalachian State, Arkansas State, Georgia State, Troy

Total: 79

Bowl ineligible teams
The American (5): Cincinnati, UConn, East Carolina, Tulane, Tulsa
ACC (4): North Carolina, Georgia Tech, Pittsburgh, Syracuse
Big Ten (6): Illinois, Indiana, Maryland, Minnesota, Nebraska, Rutgers
Big 12 (2): Baylor, Kansas
Conference USA (4): Charlotte, Old Dominion, Rice, Texas-El Paso
Independent (2): BYU, UMass
MAC (5): Ball State, Bowling Green, Eastern Michigan, Kent State, Miami (OH)
Mountain West (6): Air Force, Hawaii, Nevada, New Mexico, San Jose State, UNLV
Pac-12 (3): California, Colorado, Oregon State
SEC (5): Arkansas, Mississippi (self-imposed ban), Tennessee, Vanderbilt, Florida 
Sun Belt (6): Coastal Carolina, Georgia Southern, Idaho,  Louisiana–Monroe, South Alabama, Texas State

Total: 48

Teams one win away from bowl eligibility
ACC (1): Florida State
Sun Belt (2): Louisiana-Lafayette, New Mexico State

Total: 3

Coaching changes

Preseason and in-season
This is restricted to coaching changes taking place on or after May 1, 2017. For coaching changes that occurred earlier in 2017, see 2016 NCAA Division I FBS end-of-season coaching changes.

End of season 
This list includes coaching changes announced during the season that did not take effect until the end of the season.

Awards and honors

Heisman Trophy
The Heisman Trophy is given to the year's most outstanding player. Finalists:

Other overall
Archie Griffin Award (MVP): Finalists:
AP Player of the Year: Finalists:
Chic Harley Award (Player of the Year): Finalists:
Maxwell Award (top player): Finalists:
Saquon Barkley, Penn State
Bryce Love, Stanford
Baker Mayfield, Oklahoma
SN Player of the Year: Finalists:
Walter Camp Award (top player): Finalists:

Special overall
Burlsworth Trophy (top player who began as walk-on): Finalists:
Paul Hornung Award (most versatile player): Finalists:
Campbell Trophy ("academic Heisman"): Finalists:
Sam Benger, Carnegie Mellon (DIII)
Braxton Berrios, Miami
Mason Hampton, Boise State
Justin Jackson, Northwestern
Micah Kiser, Virginia
Justin Lea, Jacksonville State (FCS)
Brad Lundblade, Oklahoma State
Marcus Martin, Slippery Rock (DII)
Chandon Sullivan, Georgia State
Blaise Taylor, Arkansas State
Marlon Walls, Stephen F. Austin (FCS)
Chris Weber, Nebraska 
Jake Wieneke, South Dakota State (FCS)
Wuerffel Trophy (humanitarian-athlete): Finalists:
Blaise Taylor, Arkansas State
Courtney Love, Kentucky
Drue Tranquill, Notre Dame
POLY POY (Polynesian College Football Player of the Year): Finalists:

Offense
Quarterback
Davey O'Brien Award (quarterback): Finalists:
J.T. Barrett, Ohio State
Baker Mayfield, Oklahoma
Mason Rudolph, Oklahoma State
Johnny Unitas Award (senior/4th year quarterback): Finalists:
Kellen Moore Award (quarterback):
Manning Award (quarterback): Finalists:
Sammy Baugh Trophy (passing quarterback): Finalists:

Running back
Doak Walker Award (running back): Finalists:
Saquon Barkley, Penn State
Bryce Love, Stanford
Jonathan Taylor, Wisconsin
Jim Brown Trophy (running back): Finalists:

Wide receiver
Fred Biletnikoff Award (wide receiver): Finalists:
Michael Gallup, Colorado State
David Sills V, West Virginia
James Washington, Oklahoma State

Tight end
John Mackey Award (tight end): Finalists:
Mark Andrews, Oklahoma
Troy Fumagalli, Wisconsin
Mike Gesicki, Penn State

Lineman
Dave Rimington Trophy (center): Finalists:

Defense
 Bronko Nagurski Trophy (defensive player): Finalists:
Bradley Chubb, NC State
Minkah Fitzpatrick, Alabama
Josey Jewell, Iowa
Ed Oliver, Houston
Roquan Smith, Georgia
 Chuck Bednarik Award (defensive player): Finalists:
Bradley Chubb, NC State
Minkah Fitzpatrick, Alabama
Roquan Smith, Georgia
Lott Trophy (defensive impact): Finalists:

Defensive line
Bill Willis Award (defensive lineman): Finalists:
Dick Butkus Award (linebacker): Finalists:
Devin Bush Jr., Michigan
Tremaine Edmunds, Virginia Tech
T. J. Edwards, Wisconsin
Dorian O'Daniel, Clemson
Roquan Smith, Georgia
Jack Lambert Trophy (linebacker): Finalists:
Ted Hendricks Award (defensive end): Finalists:

Defensive back
Paycom Jim Thorpe Award (defensive back): Finalists:
DeShon Elliott, Texas
Minkah Fitzpatrick, Alabama
Josh Jackson, Iowa
Jack Tatum Trophy (defensive back): Finalists:

Special teams
Lou Groza Award (placekicker): Finalists:
Daniel Carlson, Auburn
Dominik Eberle, Utah State
Matt Gay, Utah
Ray Guy Award (punter): Finalists:
Michael Dickson, Texas
J. K. Scott, Alabama
Mitch Wishnowsky, Utah

Other positional awards
Outland Trophy (interior lineman on either offense or defense): Finalists:
Orlando Brown, Oklahoma
Quenton Nelson, Notre Dame
Ed Oliver, Houston

Television viewers and ratings

Most watched regular season games

Conference championship games

See also

 2017 NCAA Division I FBS football rankings
 2017 NCAA Division I FCS football season
 2017 NCAA Division II football season
 2017 NCAA Division III football season

Notes

References